Bapeng (Bapɛŋ, Mopeny, Pe) is an extinct Senegambian language of Senegal spoken by traditional hunter-gatherers.

References

Rosine Santos & M-P Ferry (1975) "Deux lexique tenda:  lexique w̃eỹ (koñagi) suivi d'un lexique pe". Les Langues Africaines au Sénégal 62, Dakar.

Fula–Tenda languages
Languages of Senegal